List of conflicts in the British America is a timeline of events that includes Indian wars, battles, skirmishes massacres and other related items that occurred in Britain's American territory up to 1783 when British America was formally ended by the Treaty of Paris and replaced by British North America and the United States.

16th century
1565 Spanish massacre of French Huguenots at Fort Caroline in Florida. This is notable as it is the first conflict between European powers in what is today the United States.

17th century
1609 - 1613 First Anglo–Powhatan War
1622 Jamestown Massacre in which English settlers are attacked by Indians of the Powhatan Confederacy in Jamestown Colony in Virginia
1637 Pequot War in New England
1637 Kent Island Rebellion in Maryland
1641 - 1667 First Beaver War in the Great Lakes region
1643 - 1645 Kieft's War in New Netherland
1644 - 1647 Claiborne and Ingle's Rebellion in Maryland; part of the English Civil War
1644 - 1646 Second Anglo–Powhatan War following Opechancanough's Massacre in Virginia
1655 Battle of the Severn in Maryland; part of the English Civil War
1655 Peach Tree War in New Netherland (Delaware, New Jersey, New York
1659 - 1660 First Esopus War in New Netherland
1659 - 1660 Fendall's Rebellion in Maryland; part of the English Civil War
1663 Second Esopus War in New Netherland
1664 Second Anglo-Dutch War in which the English conquer New Netherland and rename it New York and New Jersey (The war lasts in Europe and elsewhere until 1667.)
1673 - 1674 Third Anglo-Dutch War in which the Dutch re-capture New York, New Jersey, Delaware but return territory to the English after the war
1675 - 1676 King Philip's War in New England
1675 Battle of Bloody Brook
1676 Bacon's Rebellion in Virginia
1677 Culpeper's Rebellion in Carolina
1683 - 1701 Second Beaver War in the Great Lakes region
1689 - 1692 Overthrow of the Dominion of New England and Sir Edmund Andros; part of the Glorious Revolution
1689 - 1691 Leisler's Rebellion in New York; part of the Glorious Revolution
1689 - 1692 Coode's Rebellion in Maryland; part of the Glorious Revolution
1689 - 1697 King William's War; related to the Glorious Revolution and the Nine Years' War

18th century
1702 - 1713 Queen Anne's War
1702 Battle of Flint River
1703 Battle of Falmouth
1704 Raid on Deerfield
1703 - 1719 Noncomformists Disturbances in Jamaica, New York
1703 Political factionalism riot in Charleston, South Carolina
1704 Riot of Young Gentry in Philadelphia
1705 Privateersman's riot in New York
1710 Boston Bread riot
1711 - 1715 Tuscarora War
1711 Cary's Rebellion in North Carolina
1711 Dutch Church Riot in Flatbush, New York
1711 Anti-impressment riot in New York
1712 New York Slave Revolt of 1712
1715 - 1717 Yamasee War
1716 - 1729 Natchez Wars
1718 Riotous seizure of records in North Carolina
1719 Anti-customs riot in Newport, Rhode Island
1719 Overthrow of the proprietor in South Carolina
1720 Defeat of the Spanish Villasur expedition in present-day Nebraska by Pawnee (with the possible assistance of the French)
1722 Jailbreak riot in Hartford, Connecticut
1722 - 1727 Dummer's War with the Abenaki Indians in Maine and New Hampshire
1726 Philadelphia riot against pillory and stocks
1730 - 1738 Cresap's War (aka Conojocular War), border conflict between Pennsylvania and Maryland
1734 Riot against ship seizure in Hartford County, Connecticut
1734 Mast-Tree Riot in Exeter, New Hampshire
1736 - 1752 Chickasaw Wars
1737 Anti-prostitution riot in Boston
1737 Anti-markethouse riot in Boston
1737 Anti-Quitrent riot in North Carolina
1738 Fish Dam Riot on the Schuylkill River, Pennsylvania
1739 Stono Rebellion, slave rebellion in South Carolina
1741 New York Conspiracy of 1741, a suspected slave revolt
1739 - 1748 War of Jenkins' Ear with Spain
 1742 Battle of Gully Hole Creek
 1742 Battle of Bloody Marsh
1742 Philadelphia Election riot
1742 Battle of Galudoghson
1744 - 1748 King George's War
1745 - 1754 Horseneck Riots, land riots in New Jersey
1747 Impressment riot in Boston
1750 Election riot in York, Pennsylvania
1751 - 1757 Anti-rent riot by tenants in New York
1754 Riot against the surveyor of the woods in Exeter, New Hampshire
1754 - 1763 French and Indian War/ Seven Years' War
1754 Battle of Fort Necessity (Great Meadows)
1755 Braddock Expedition (Battle of the Monongahela)
1755 Battle of Lake George
1756 Battle of Fort Bull
1756 Battle of Fort Oswego (1756)
1757 Battle of Sabbath Day Point
1757 Battle of Fort William Henry, including subsequent "massacre"
1758 Battle of Fort Duquesne
1758 Battle of Ticonderoga
1758 Battle of Fort Duquesne
1759 Battle of Fort Niagara
1757 Riot against the recruitment of troops in Brentwood, New Hampshire
1757 Seizure of longboat of HMS Enterprise by mob in Portsmouth, New Hampshire
1758 - 1761 Cherokee War in Georgia
1759 Anti-land tax riot in North Carolina
1770 Battle of Golden Hill
1763 Pontiac's Rebellion
1763 - 1764 Paxton Boys' Rebellion in Pennsylvania
1763 Wyoming Valley Massacre against Connecticut settlers in Pennsylvania
1764 Pope Day Riot in Boston
1765 Stamp Act riots in Boston, Rhode Island, Connecticut, New York, and Maryland
1765 - 1771 War of the Regulation
1771 Battle at the Yadkin River in North Carolina 
1771 Battle of Alamance which was also fought in North Carolina
1766 Quartering Act riot in New York
1769 - 1771 First Pennamite War between settlers from Connecticut and Pennsylvania in Wyoming Valley of Pennsylvania
1770 Boston Massacre
1772 Burning of the customs schooner HMS Gaspee in Narragansett Bay
1773 - 1774 Lord Dunmore's War
1775 - 1783 American Revolutionary War
1775
Battles of Lexington and Concord
Siege of Boston
Battle of Ticonderoga
Battle of Bunker Hill
1776
Battle of Long Island
Battle of Harlem Heights
Battle of White Plains
Battle of Trenton
1777
Battle of Princeton
Battle of Oriskany
Battle of Bennington
Battle of Brandywine Creek
Battle of Saratoga
Capture of Philadelphia
Battle of Germantown
1778
Battle of Monmouth
Battle of Savannah
1779
Battle of Baton Rouge
Battle of Vincennes
1780
Battle of Charleston
Battle of Camden
Battle of King's Mountain
1781
Battle of Cowpens
Battle of Guilford Court House
Siege of Ninety Six
Siege of Yorktown

See also
 List of conflicts in the United States
 Classification of indigenous peoples of the Americas

Conflicts in British America
Conflicts in British America
Conflicts in British America
Conflicts in British America